Lamellitrochus pourtalesi is a deep-sea species of sea snail, a marine gastropod mollusk in the family Solariellidae.

Distribution
This species occurs in the Gulf of Mexico, the Caribbean Sea and off Puerto Rico at depths between 293 m and 2276 m.

Description 
The maximum recorded shell length is 10.3 mm.

Habitat 
Minimum recorded depth is 293 m. Maximum recorded depth is 2276 m.

References

 Clench, W. J. and C. G. Aguayo. 1939. Notes and descriptions of new deep-water Mollusca obtained by the Harvard-Havana Expedition off the coast of Cuba. II. Memorias de la Sociedad Cubana de Historia Natural "Felipe Poey" 13: 189–197, pls. 28-29
 Rosenberg, G., F. Moretzsohn, and E. F. García. 2009. Gastropoda (Mollusca) of the Gulf of Mexico, Pp. 579–699 in Felder, D.L. and D.K. Camp (eds.), Gulf of Mexico–Origins, Waters, and Biota. Biodiversity. Texas A&M Press, College Station, Texas.

pourtalesi
Molluscs of the Atlantic Ocean
Gastropods described in 1939
Taxa named by William J. Clench